Oleksandr Oleksandrovych Akymenko (born 5 September 1985) is a Ukrainian former professional footballer who played as a striker.

Early career
Akymenko was born in Antratsyt, Soviet Union, and trained at the Luhansk College of Physical Culture football section.

Career

Avanhard Rovenky
Akymenko began his playing career at Avanhard Rovenky.

Stal Alchevsk
Than he joined Stal Alchevsk and made his debut coming in as a second-half substitute against Shakhtar Donetsk on 18 September 2005 in the Ukrainian Premier League.

Return to Stal Alchevsk
In 2014, he became Ukrainian First League top scorer while playing for FC Stal Alchevsk.

Zirka Kirovohrad
In 2016, along with Zirka Kirovohrad he won the Ukrainian First League and Zirka was promoted to the Ukrainian Premier League.

Inhulets Petrove
In 2018, as a player of Inhulets Petrove, Akymenko became Ukrainian First League top goalscorer for the second time.
On 5 September 2018 Akymenko was honored by PFL and UA-Football as the best players of August 2018 becoming the first player who received the award.
On 30 September 2018, Akymenko became the fourth player to score 100 goals in the Ukrainian First League in the 1–0 away win against Sumy.

References

External links 
 
 Profile at FC Stal official club site (Ukr)
 

1985 births
Living people
People from Antratsyt
Ukrainian footballers
FC Hirnyk Rovenky players
FC Stal Alchevsk players
FC Helios Kharkiv players
FC Metalurh Donetsk players
FC Zirka Kropyvnytskyi players
FC Inhulets Petrove players
FC Livyi Bereh Kyiv players
Ukrainian Premier League players
Ukrainian First League players
Ukrainian Second League players
Ukrainian Amateur Football Championship players
Association football forwards
Sportspeople from Luhansk Oblast